Dendrobium nobile, commonly known as the noble dendrobium, is a member of the family Orchidaceae. It has become a popular cultivated decorative house plant, because it produces colourful blooms in winter and spring, at a time when little else is in flower. It is also one of the 50 fundamental herbs used in traditional Chinese medicine, known as shí hú or shí hú lán. Dendrobium nobile is one of the most widespread ornamental members of the orchid family. Its blooms are variegated in colour, shading from white through pink and purple, and the many different cultivated varieties produce different sized and coloured blooms.

Dendrobium nobile is an epiphytic or lithophytic plant native to southern China (including Tibet), the Himalayas (India, Bangladesh, Assam, Nepal, Bhutan), and Indochina (Myanmar, Thailand, Laos, Vietnam). The species is also reportedly naturalized in Hawaii. It is the state flower of Sikkim.

Dendrobium nobile occurs in lowland and mountain forests, often on mossy limestone rocks. It is a tender plant that only survives winters in USDA hardiness zones 11 and above. It has strap-shaped, persistent leaves, and blooms mostly in winter and spring. It produces short, 2 to 4 flowered racemes, fragrant, waxy, and highly variable in color, arising from the upper nodes of leafed and leafless canes.

Examples of the species are grown in Kew Gardens Tropical Nursery in London and seeds are stored in the Millennium Seed Bank there.

Characteristics 

Dendrobium nobile is a sympodial orchid which forms pseudobulbs. When the life cycle of the mother plant ends it produces offsets, continuing the life of the plant. The new plant then goes through the same cycle. The inflorescence is erect; during the flowering period blooms form along the length of the flowering stem. This seedling is monocot that is it forms only a single initial leaf, and the plant has thin white roots which attach themselves to another plant or object, making it an epiphytic plant.

Chemical constituents
Extract of the stems of Dendrobium nobile yielded 17 phenanthrenes (including 3,4,8-trimethoxyphenanthrene-2,5-diol, 2,8-dihydroxy-3,4,7-trimethoxyphenanthrene, 3-hydroxy-2,4,7-trimethoxy-9,10-dihydrophenanthrene, 2,8-dihydroxy-3,4,7-trimethoxy-9,10-dihydrophenanthrene, 2-hydroxy-4,7-dimethoxy-9,10-dihydrophenanthrene, 2,2'-dihydroxy-3,3',4,4',7,7'-hexamethoxy-9,9',10,10'-tetrahydro-1,1'-biphenanthrene and 2,3,5-trihydroxy-4,9-dimethoxyphenanthrene). There have been many studies on the complex chemistry of the plant.

Toxicity
Dendrobium nobile has been added to the EU novel foods catalogue as it is deemed unsafe for human consumption within food supplements without a safety assessment.

See also 
 Dendrobine, a toxin found in Dendrobium nobile

References

External links 
 
 Dendrobium nobile List of Chemicals (Dr. Duke's Databases)
 National orchid societies which give advice about the cultivation of Dendrobium nobile and other orchid species include:
 The American Orchid Society
 The Orchid Society of Great Britain

nobile
Epiphytic orchids
Flora of Indo-China
Flora of the Indian subcontinent
Orchids of China
National symbols of Sikkim
Orchids of India
Plants described in 1830
Plants used in traditional Chinese medicine